The 2008 Setanta Sports Cup was the 4th staging of the cross-border cup competition featuring football clubs from the Republic of Ireland and Northern Ireland. The final was played on November 1, 2008, at Turners Cross in Cork.

Group stage
The draw for this round was held 17 January 2008.  The matches were played 26 February 2008 – 23 September 2008.

Teams that progressed to the Semi-Finals are indicated in bold type.

Teams eliminated from the Setanta Sports Cup this stage are indicated in italics''.

Group 1

Group 2

Semi-finals
The draw for the semi-finals was made by drawing the winners of Group A against the runners-up of Group 2 and vice versa, with group winners having home advantage. Glentoran beat Drogheda United 1–0 in the first semi-final, which was played at United Park in Drogheda, while Cork City overcame Derry City by the same scoreline at the Brandywell Stadium in Derry.

Final
The final took place on November 1, 2008, at Turners Cross stadium in front of 5,500, a sell out crowd, in Cork, where Cork City came from behind to beat Glentoran 2-1 and win the competition for the first time.

Goalscorers
4 goals
  Mark Farren (Derry City)
  Éamon Zayed (Drogheda United)

3 goals
  Denis Behan (Cork City)
  Daryl Fordyce (Glentoran)
  Michael Halliday (Glentoran)
  Gary O'Neill (St Patrick's Athletic)

2 goals

  Darren Boyce (Glentoran)
  Keith Fahey (St Patrick's Athletic)
  Rory Hamill (Cliftonville)
  Adam Hughes (Drogheda United)
  Ciarán Martyn (Derry City)
  Paul McAreavey (Linfield)
  Darren Murphy (Cork City)
  Colin Nixon (Glentoran)
  George O'Callaghan (Cork City)

1 goal

  Timmy Adamson (Dungannon Swifts)
  Aaron Baker (Dungannon Swifts)
  Richie Baker (Drogheda United)
  Killian Brennan (Derry City)
  Ollie Cahill (Drogheda United)
  Mark Dickson (Linfield)
  Glenn Ferguson (Linfield)
  Grant Gardiner (Glentoran)
  Robert Garrett (Linfield)
  Graham Gartland (Drogheda United)
  Tony Grant (Drogheda United)
  Ruaidhri Higgins (Derry City)
  Jason Hill (Glentoran)
  Mark Holland (Cliftonville)
  Liam Kearney (Cork City)
  Timmy Kiely (Cork City)
  Shea McGerrigan (Dungannon Swifts)
  Kevin McHugh (Derry City)
  George McMullan (Cliftonville)
  Dave Mooney (Cork City)
  Jamie Mulgrew (Linfield)
  Francis Murphy (Cliftonville)
  Dan Murray (Cork City)
  Declan O'Brien (Drogheda United)
  John O'Flynn (Cork City)
  Mark Patterson (Cliftonville)
  Mark Quigley (St Patrick's Athletic)
  Darragh Ryan (Cork City)
  Conor Sammon (Derry City)
  John Tambouras (Drogheda United)
  Peter Thompson (Linfield)

1 own goal
  Clive Delaney (Derry City)
  Adam McMinn (Dungannon Swifts)

References

External links
 Official Setanta Cup Site

2008
1
Set